Kettering is a constituency in Northamptonshire represented in the House of Commons of the UK Parliament since 2005 by Philip Hollobone, a Conservative.

Boundaries 

1918–1950: The Urban Districts of Desborough, Kettering, and Rothwell, the Rural Districts of Brixworth, Kettering, and Oxendon, and in the Rural District of Northampton the parishes of Great Billing, Little Billing, and Weston Favell.

1950–1974: The Municipal Borough of Kettering, the Urban Districts of Burton Latimer, Corby, Desborough, and Rothwell, and the Rural Districts of Brixworth and Kettering.

1974–1983: The Municipal Borough of Kettering, the Urban Districts of Burton Latimer, Corby, Desborough, and Rothwell, and the Rural District of Kettering.

1983–1997: The Borough of Kettering, and the District of Daventry wards of Boughton and Pitsford, Brixworth, Clipston, Moulton, and Overstone and Walgrave.

1997–2010: The Borough of Kettering, and the District of Daventry wards of Boughton and Pitsford, Brixworth, Clipston, Guilsborough, Moulton, Overstone and Walgrave, Spratton, and Welford.

2010–2021: The Borough of Kettering.

2021-present: The North Northamptonshire Council wards of Burton and Broughton, Clover Hill, Desborough, Ise, Northall, Rothwell and Mawsley, Wicksteed, Windmill

The constituency covers the major town of Kettering, the smaller towns of Desborough, Rothwell and Burton Latimer together with a number of villages. A semi-rural seat, the preponderance of constituents live in the towns and a minority of the wards form a wide array of rural communities that have civil parish or hamlet status.

The constituency created in 1918 included the generally (in the late 20th century) Labour-majority industrial town of Corby until the 1983 general election, when Corby gained its own constituency.

The Boundary Commission's Fifth Periodic Review of Westminster constituencies proposed an additional seat due to population growth in the county.  Parliament approved its recommendations for 2010 which made way for the new constituency of South Northamptonshire therefore the constituency lost some wards in these boundary changes.

Constituency profile
Economically, it is predominantly middle-class, well within managerial/directorial commuter zones for London and the West Midlands. Industry continues in some sectors ranging from, for example, lingerie, food production, rigid containers, abattoirs, to the Weetabix factory in Burton Latimer, but the industrial activity of the area, as with the rest of the county, is reduced whereas the wider area's headline gross value added for the area per head has been mostly consistently higher, from £11,667 in 1997 in North Northamptonshire to £17,835.

In 2005 The Guardian described it as:

Members of Parliament 
The current Member of Parliament is Philip Hollobone of the Conservative Party. He was elected in 2005 when he defeated the sitting Labour MP, Phil Sawford, in an election which nationally saw a reduced majority for the Blair Ministry.

Kettering Constituency (1918-present)

Mid Northamptonshire Constituency (1885-1918)
Prior to boundary changes in 1918, at least the majority of modern-day Kettering Constituency laid within the Mid Northamptonshire constituency.

North Northamptonshire Constituency (1832-1885)
Prior to boundary changes in 1885, at least the majority of modern-day Kettering Constituency laid within the North Northamptonshire constituency, which elected two members to Parliament.

Elections

Elections in the 2010s

Elections in the 2000s

Elections in the 1990s

Elections in the 1980s

Note: The boundary changes to the seat for the 1983 election meant that this seat would have been won by the Conservatives in 1979, as parts of the seat were moved into the newly created seat of Corby which was notionally Labour on the new boundaries and thus saw William Homewood attempt (unsuccessfully albeit) to seek re-election there.

Elections in the 1970s

Elections in the 1960s

Elections in the 1950s

Elections in the 1940s

The British Council commissioned a short film on the 1945 General Election which portrays the contest in the Kettering constituency.

Elections in the 1930s

Elections in the 1920s

Elections in the 1910s

See also 
 1940 Kettering by-election
 List of parliamentary constituencies in Northamptonshire

Notes

References

Sources

External links 
 Kettering Liberal Democrats
 Kettering Conservatives
 Kettering Labour Party

Parliamentary constituencies in Northamptonshire
Constituencies of the Parliament of the United Kingdom established in 1918
UK Parliament constituency